The 1971–72 Memphis Pros season was the 2nd and final season of the Pros in the American Basketball Association. By the middle of the season, they were 17–25. In the second half of the season, they went 9–33, with a 10-game losing streak from February 4 to February 23 being the lowlight. In fact, the team ended the season on a nine-game losing streak. The biggest winning streak was 3, which they accomplished three times in the season. The Pros were 10th in points scored with 107.5 points per game and 6th in points allowed with 113.0 points per game. On December 11, 1971, the operation of the franchise was taken over by the league. With the team struggling financially, they were sold on June 13, 1972, to Charles O. Finley, owner of the Oakland Athletics and the Oakland Seals. Soon after they were rebranded as the Memphis Tams, while playing at the same arena as the Pros. In their first season, they lost 60 games.

Roster    
 -- Larry Cannon - Shooting guard 
 34 Lee Davis - Power forward 
 35 Warren Davis - Power forward 
 32 Randy Denton - Center
 12 Coby Dietrick - Center
 13 Jerry Dover - Point guard	 
 25 Gerald Govan - Power forward 
 11 Wil Jones - Small forward 
 23 Loyd King - Shooting guard 
 33 Wendell Ladner - Small forward 
 21 George Lehmann - Shooting guard 
 14 Johnny Neumann - Shooting guard 
 24 Tom Owens - Center
 22 Donald Sidle - Power forward 
 21 Bob Warren - Shooting guard 
 -- Elnardo Webster - Small forward 
 10 Charlie Williams - Point guard

Final standings

Western Division

Awards and honors
1972 ABA All-Star Game selection (game played on January 29, 1972) 
 Wil Jones

References

External links
 RememberTheABA.com 1971–72 regular season and playoff results
 Memphis Pros page

Memphis Pros
Memphis Pros, 1971-72
Memphis Pros, 1972-72
Basketball in Memphis, Tennessee